Kayadüzü is a village in the Merzifon District, Amasya Province, Turkey. Its population is 1,365 (2021). Before the 2013 reorganisation, it was a town (belde).

References

Villages in Merzifon District